The AMA Motorcycle Hall of Fame Museum is an offshoot of the American Motorcyclist Association, recognizing individuals who have contributed to motorcycle sport, motorcycle construction, or motorcycling in general. It also displays motorcycles, riding gear, and memorabilia.

The museum is located in Pickerington, Ohio, United States.

List of inductees

External links

Official Website

Halls of fame in Ohio
Hall of Fame
Transportation museums in Ohio
Museums in Franklin County, Ohio
Hall of Fame